The Hollow Point is a 2016 American Western film directed by Gonzalo López-Gallego and written by Nils Lyew. The film stars Patrick Wilson, Lynn Collins, Ian McShane, John Leguizamo, Jim Belushi and Michael Flynn. The film was released on December 16, 2016, by Vertical Entertainment.

Cast
 Patrick Wilson as Sheriff Wallace Skolin
 Lynn Collins as Marla
 Ian McShane as Sheriff Leland Kilbaught
 John Leguizamo as Atticus
 Jim Belushi as Shepard "Shep" Diaz
 Michael Flynn as Jesse
 Heather Beers as Ellie
 Nathan Stevens as Clive Mercy
 David Fernandez Jr. as Eugenio
 David H. Stevens as Ken Mercy
 Karli Hall as Lilly
 Derek Boone as Samuel "Sam" Gibbons
 Carl Hadra as Clay Kinston

Release
The film was released on December 16, 2016, by Vertical Entertainment.

References

External links
 
 

2016 films
2016 Western (genre) films
American Western (genre) films
Neo-Western films
2010s English-language films
Films directed by Gonzalo López-Gallego
2010s American films